The Old National Pronunciation was the system established for the phonology of standard Chinese as decided by the Commission on the Unification of Pronunciation from 1913 onwards, and published in the 1919 edition of the Guóyīn Zìdiǎn ("Dictionary of National Pronunciation"). Although it was mainly based on the phonology of the Beijing dialect, it was also influenced by historical forms of northern Mandarin as well as other varieties of Mandarin and even some varieties of Wu Chinese.

The artificial nature of the system proved impractical, and in 1926 a decision was made to normalize the pronunciations to the natural pronunciations found in Beijing, which resulted in a revised Guóyīn Chángyòng Zìhuì ("Vocabulary of National Pronunciation for Everyday Use") published in 1932.

Phonology
The Old National Pronunciation was similar to the phonology of the Beijing dialect, but with four additional distinctions derived from Middle Chinese that were still maintained in other dialects:
 Preservation of the "round-sharp distinction". In the Old National Pronunciation, the former group were treated as palatals, but the latter group remained as alveolars.
 Preservation of the checked tone. Although how it was to be realized was not specifically detailed in the original dictionary, it was often given pronounced with a final glottal stop, as in Lower Yangtze Mandarin varieties such as the Nanjing dialect.

The actual phonetic values of these tones were not prescribed in the 1919 edition of the Dictionary of National Pronunciation. Although various proposals of merging values from different areas of China were raised, the de facto standard was to use the tonal system of Beijing, and to simply read the entering tone (which the Beijing dialect lacked as a distinctive tone) as a shortened departing tone, falling in nature, as shown from sets of gramophone recordings of Wang Pu, a member of the Commission, and of noted linguist Yuen Ren Chao.

Phonetic symbols

The notation used to indicate the prescribed pronunciation was zhuyin zimu (also known as zhuyin fuhao, as adopted by the Commission on the Unification of Pronunciation.

In the following tables, the zhuyin fuhao symbols are shown with equivalents in the IPA and modern pinyin (where applicable).

The tone system used at the time was different from the modern version of zhuyin fuhao: the dark level tone was unmarked, and the light level, rising, departing and entering tone each had a single dot marked at the bottom left, top left, top right and bottom right corners respectively, thus resembling the tone-marking system of Middle Chinese to a large degree.

Notes

References

History of the Chinese language
Standard Chinese